Frank Dunstone Graham (January 1, 1890 – September 24, 1949) was an American economist. He was a professor of economics at Princeton University from 1921 to 1945. Graham died in 1949 from a fall at Palmer Stadium during a Princeton Tigers football game.

References 

1890 births
1949 deaths
People from Halifax, Nova Scotia
20th-century American economists
Dalhousie University alumni
Harvard University alumni
Princeton University faculty